Burton House may refer to:

Places

United States
 P. D. Burton House, Lewisville, AR, listed on the NRHP in Arkansas
 Robert Wilton Burton House, Auburn, AL, listed on the NRHP in Alabama
 Burton House (Lavonia, Georgia), listed on the NRHP in Georgia
 The Burton, Indianapolis, Indiana, a building listed on the NRHP in Indianapolis, Indiana
 Burton House (Chestnut Grove, Kentucky), listed on the NRHP in Kentucky
 Ambrose Burton House, Harrodsburg, KY, listed on the NRHP in Kentucky
 David Burton House, Shelbyville, KY, listed on the NRHP in Kentucky
Burton-Conner_House. Cambridge, MA
 Burton, Benjamin, Garrison Site, Cushing, ME, listed on the NRHP in Maine
 Burton-Rosenmeier House, Little Falls, MN, listed on the NRHP in Minnesota
 William H. Burton House, Waterloo, NY, listed on the NRHP in New York
 Burton House (Newberry, South Carolina), listed on the NRHP in South Carolina
 Burton House (Hurley, Wisconsin)

United Kingdom
Burton Court, Eardisland, a wedding and conference venue in north Herefordshire
Burton Court, Linton, a grade II listed house in south Herefordshire
Burton’s Court, a park in Chelsea, London